A Thief in the Dark is a 1928 American silent mystery film directed by Albert Ray, written by C. Graham Baker and William Kernell (based on a plot idea from director Ray), and starring George Meeker, Doris Hill, Gwen Lee, Marjorie Beebe, Michael Vavitch and Noah Young. The film was released on May 20, 1928, by Fox Film Corporation.

Plot
A young drifter named Ernest joins a troupe of phony mystics working in a carnival, led by a Professor Xeno. Ernest learns that his colleagues are systematically burglarizing some of the wealthy homes in the towns through which they travel. Ernest finds out that Xeno has stooped to murdering an old lady for her jewelry, and sets about trying to expose Xeno to the authorities.

Cast      
George Meeker as Ernest
Doris Hill as Elise
Gwen Lee as Flo
Marjorie Beebe as Jeanne
Michael Vavitch as Professor Xeno
Noah Young as Monk
Charles Belcher as Duke
Ray Turner as Beauregard
Erville Alderson as Armstrong

Production
The film is thought by critics to have lifted its storyline from Tod Browning's successful 1925 film The Unholy Three. Cameraman Edeson later became one of James Whale's favorite associates, photographing Frankenstein (1931), The Old Dark House (1932) and The Invisible Man (1933) for the director.

References

External links
 

1928 films
American mystery films
1928 mystery films
Fox Film films
Films directed by Albert Ray
American silent feature films
American black-and-white films
1920s English-language films
1920s American films
Silent mystery films